Katharine McPhee is the debut studio album by American Idol season five runner-up, Katharine McPhee. The album was released on January 30, 2007, by RCA Records in North America. It debuted at number two on the Billboard 200, selling 116,000 copies in its first week, only behind Norah Jones' Not Too Late. To date, the album has sold over 378,000 copies.

Background
The album's release date changed on many occasions. Originally it was set for November 14, then November 28, December 5, December 19, and eventually—at McPhee's insistence—January 30, 2007. It sold 116,000 copies in its first week, debuting at No. 2 on the U.S. Billboard 200 chart. The album was released by RCA Records in association with 19 Recordings Limited. The album contains twelve songs, three of which McPhee co-wrote.

Production
The album includes writing and production contributions from Babyface, The Underdogs, Kara DioGuardi, and Nate “Danja” Hills. It was also said that Ryan Leslie contributed to the album. However, none of the songs written or produced by him made the track listing.  McPhee has described the album as rhythm pop, taking a different route from the traditional pop ballads she sang on American Idol.

Promotion
On December 19, 2006, RCA released two songs, "I Lost You" and "Dangerous" as singles for a Wal-Mart exclusive. "I Lost You" was cut from the final album track listing. On January 2, 2007 the first single, "Over It", and three snippets, "Each Other"; "Love Story"; and "Open Toes", were released on AOL Music: First Listen. Also accompanied were photos, quotes from the credited artist, and fan polls. McPhee was reportedly quoted on AOL Music for describing the first single, "it's a term that everyone uses, especially young girls. I didn't even realize just how much I used it. A lot of people will be able to relate to this song. This is really the only pure pop song on the record, so I thought it would be a good first single."

Singles
The first single from the album, "Over It" was released to radio on January 30, 2007. It peaked at number 29 on the Billboard Hot 100. To date, it has sold 645,000 downloads in the US. The second single, "Love Story" was released to radio on May 29, 2007. It did not chart on Billboard. To date, it has sold 92,000 downloads in the US.

Other notable songs
"Better Off Alone"  has sold 34,000 downloads in the US.

Track listing

Charts

Weekly charts

Year-end charts

References

External links
Katharine McPhee on Myspace

2007 debut albums 
19 Recordings albums 
Albums produced by Walter Afanasieff 
Albums produced by Danja (record producer)
Albums produced by Marti Frederiksen
Albums produced by Emanuel Kiriakou 
Albums produced by Billy Steinberg
Albums produced by the Underdogs (production team)
Katharine McPhee albums
RCA Records albums